Strait Feronia is a passenger, freight and vehicle or ROPAX ferry owned and operated by StraitNZ as part of its Bluebridge subsidiary. The vessel was initially named Mersey Viking and saw service in the Irish Sea, eventually being renamed Dublin Viking and then Dublin Seaways. The vessel was acquired by the Stena Line and renamed Stena Feronia and saw service between Tangier and Algericas and later between Kiel and Gothenburg.

History
The Strait Feronia was launched on 7 December 1996 as the 'Mersey Viking for  the Irish Sea ferry operator Norse Irish Ferries. The ship was built by Cantiere Navale Visentini in Italy. The ship entered service in July 1997 operating between Liverpool and Belfast. She remained on this route until December 2005 when she moved to the Birkenhead - Dublin route. Prior to transferring to the Dublin route the ship was renamed Dublin Viking. On 7 August 2007 a mooring rope at the ship's stern parted whilst preparing to depart Dublin. Two people were injured by the parting rope. A member of the ship's crew later died of their injuries. Another name change occurred in August 2010. The vessel was renamed Dublin Seaways following DFDS's acquisition of Norfolkline.

In January 2011 DFDS Seaways closed the Birkenhead - Dublin route. The Dublin Seaways was sold to Stena Line and renamed Stena Feronia. On 7 March 2012 the Stena Feronia collided with the cargo ship Union Moon just before entering the fairway of Belfast Lough. The Stena Feronia was holed above the waterline but was able to berth safely in Belfast. In 2012, she was chartered to the Moroccan ferry operator; Inter Shipping for use between Tangier and Algeciras, she was used successfully for two years on that route before she was replaced in October 2014 by the LD Lines vessel,  which had been chartered to Inter Shipping, The Stena Feronia then left service and was anchored off the coast of Gibraltar for a short while before she headed back to Belfast. She was laid up in Belfast before she covered for  whilst she was off service when she was in dry dock at both Belfast and Falmouth at the beginning of December 2014, when the Stena Mersey returned to service Stena Feronia was removed from service on 21 December 2014 and was laid up in Belfast. She departed Belfast on 23 December and arrived in Sweden after Christmas where she was laid up. Starting from 26 January 2015 the vessel operated between Kiel and Gothenburg for eight weeks as a temporary replacement for the Stena Germanica, which underwent a refit.

In early 2015 Strait Shipping in New Zealand purchased the Stena Feronia and renamed her the Strait Feronia. She was delivered in June 2015 after a 45-day sailing from Sweden.

Sister ships
The Strait Feronia was the first of two identical ships built by Cantiere Navale Visentini for Norse Irish Ferries.

Gallery

References

External links
 Bluebridge website

Ships built in Italy
Ships built by Cantiere Navale Visentini
Ferry companies of New Zealand
Cook Strait ferries
Picton, New Zealand
1996 ships